The eastern crevice-skink (Egernia mcpheei) is a species of large skink, a lizard in the family Scincidae. The species is native to eastern Australia.

References

Skinks of Australia
Egernia
Reptiles described in 1984
Taxa named by Richard Walter Wells
Taxa named by Cliff Ross Wellington